Blake Channel is a channel in Southeast Alaska, U.S.A. It extends , separating the southeastern part of Wrangell Island from the mainland. It was first traversed and charted in 1793 by James Johnstone, one of George Vancouver's officers during his 1791-95 expedition.

References

Straits of Alaska
Straits of Wrangell, Alaska